Bjarne Laustsen (born 19 December 1968 in Skivum) is a Danish politician, who is a member of the Folketing for the Social Democrats political party. He was elected into parliament in the 1998 Danish general election, having previously been in parliament between 1992 and 1994. He was on the municipal council of Støvring Municipality from 1986 to 1993.

References

External links 
 Biography on the website of the Danish Parliament (Folketinget)

Living people
1968 births
People from Vesthimmerland Municipality
Danish municipal councillors
Social Democrats (Denmark) politicians
Members of the Folketing 2019–2022
Members of the Folketing 2015–2019
Members of the Folketing 2011–2015
Members of the Folketing 2007–2011
Members of the Folketing 2005–2007
Members of the Folketing 2001–2005
Members of the Folketing 1998–2001
Members of the Folketing 1990–1994
Members of the Folketing 2022–2026